Market Theatre and similar can mean:
Market Theatre (Johannesburg), South Africa
Market Theatre (Ledbury), in Herefordshire, England
Lace Market Theatre, in Nottingham, England

See also
Market Theater Gum Wall, in Seattle, Washington, United States